Palmira Leitão de Almeida Barbosa, nicknamed Mirita, born 25 November 1961, is an Angolan handball player. She began her career at Clube Ferroviário de Luanda in the 1980s and in 1996 moved to Petro Atlético. She joined the Angolan handball squad in 1980, making her international debut at the world cup in South Korea in 1990. She has since played three more world cups. In February 2000, at the age of 39, she announced her retirement and her desire to pursue a coaching career. She later reconsidered and played for two more seasons with the newly formed club ENANA.

Achievements
Throughout her career she won 8 Africa club championships with Petro Atlético, 4 African Championships for Angola, 3 all-Africa games titles, as well as participation in 4 world cups and 1 Olympic games (1996).

In 1998, the African Handball Confederation voted her the Best Female Handball Player of all times.

Politics
At present, she is a member of parliament for the ruling party MPLA.

Following the Angolan elections in 2022, she has been appointed as Minister of Sports and Youth.

References

External links
 

Angolan female handball players
Olympic handball players of Angola
Handball players at the 1996 Summer Olympics
Handball players from Luanda
1961 births
Living people
MPLA politicians
Members of the National Assembly (Angola)
21st-century Angolan women politicians
21st-century Angolan politicians